Global Impact is a non-profit organization that works with international charities based in the United States and administers four of the largest Combined Federal Campaigns (CFC), including the Combined Federal Campaign of the National Capital Area, and the Combined Federal Campaign-Overseas. The CFC is a program to raise money from federal employees for local, national, and international charities. Global Impact affiliated charities include CARE, Doctors Without Borders, Heifer International, Save the Children, the U.S. Fund for UNICEF and World Vision. In 2016, Global Impact launched a counterpart organization in the United Kingdom—Global Impact UK.

Global Impact raised more than $1.8 B since inception. In FY2018 Global Impact raised more than $73 million in total contributions, generating nearly $22 million in employee giving pledges for more than 100 charity alliance partners, and helping more than 45 corporate and nonprofit partners accomplish their philanthropic goals by providing advisory and backbone services.

Spending controversy, 2011–2012 

An audit published by the U.S. Office of Personnel Management in 2012 concluded that Global Impact had received $764,069 in reimbursements from the federal government that "could have been put to better use" for the CFC. Global Impact had received funds for neck massages, hotel room service, and movie rentals. Renee Acosta, then Global Impact's chief executive, received a $150,000 bonus following the audit.

Programs 
Global Impact provides partner-specific advisory and backbone services; workplace fundraising and representation; campaign design, marketing and implementation for workplace and signature fundraising campaigns; and fiscal sponsorship and technology services.

Global Impact has been involved with the Combined Federal Campaign (CFC), an annual workplace charity campaign for federal employees, since its inception, first as a participating charity  and then administering campaigns for more than 20 years. Global Impact was previously known as International Service Agencies when it began administering CFCs.  As of 2017 Global Impact administered four CFCs: National Capital Area, Overseas, New York City, and Central Virginia.

Since Global Impact began managing the Combined Federal Campaign of the National Capital Area, the largest CFC, its revenues grew from $47 million in the fall 2003 campaign to nearly $66 million in the fall 2011 campaign. Additionally, Global Impact has been awarded 13 Office of Personnel CFC Innovator Awards for implementing innovative strategies in the National Capital Area and Overseas campaigns that led to increased participation and/or contributions.

Research 

In 2011 Global Impact published "Moving Beyond Boundaries", a report that analyzed trends in donations to international charities. The report concluded that such giving had increased at an annual rate of 10.4% since 1987, that 22% of U.S. corporations made donations to international causes, and that 37% of major U.S. companies planned to focus more on such causes. The report concluded that corporate fundraising efforts were having a positive impact on quality of life around the world.

In 2013, Global Impact released "Giving Beyond Borders: A Study of Global Giving by U.S. Corporations".  The study, researched and written by the Indiana University Lilly Family School of Philanthropy, explores the scope and depth of international giving by U.S. corporations and examines what makes corporate-nonprofit partnerships successful. It found that 86 percent of companies that gave internationally said they plan to increase or maintain the size of their foreign giving budget in their next fiscal year. Furthermore, the two major determining factors that propel U.S. corporations to make foreign social investments are the local community needs and the company's local financial performance. The study concluded that the main attribute companies look for when selecting a nonprofit partner is a demonstrated record of producing effective and efficient results.

In 2014, Global Impact released "The Corporate Signature Program: A Custom Approach to Philanthropy", a white paper examining the growing practice of signature programs in corporate social investments. The white paper looked at why corporations invest in signature programs, what companies seek to achieve through their giving, what steps to take to create a signature program, and what types of models can be used for program management. It also provided examples of how some U.S. corporations have built their own successful signature programs.

References

External links 
Global Impact website

Development charities based in the United States
Charities based in Virginia
Non-profit organizations based in Alexandria, Virginia
Organizations established in 1956
1956 establishments in Virginia